Jan Gillisz van Vliet (1605 – 1668), was a Dutch Golden Age painter and Rembrandt pupil, whose paintings are no longer attributed to him with any certainty. Today he is known only for his drawings and prints.

Biography
He was born in Leiden where he became a Rembrandt pupil. He made a popular print series called "the beggars" and signed his prints "JG Vliet fec".
He died in Leiden.

References

Jan Georg van Vliet on Artnet

1605 births
1668 deaths
Dutch Golden Age painters
Dutch male painters
Dutch Golden Age printmakers
Artists from Leiden
Pupils of Rembrandt